Buji may refer to:

 Buji, Iran, a village in Zanjan Province, Iran
 Buji, Jigawa, a Local Government Area of Jigawa State, Nigeria
 Buji language (Nigeria), a language spoken in Bassa Local Government Area of Plateau State, Nigeria
 Buji station, a metro station in Shenzhen
 Buji Subdistrict, a sub-district of Longgang, Shenzhen, China
 Buji Town, a disestablished town in Longgang, Shenzhen, China
 Isaac Herzog, Israeli politician